Charles John Prescott (9 June 1857 – 12 June 1946) was an English born Australian army chaplain, Methodist minister and headmaster.

Early life
Prescott was born in Bridport, Dorset, the eldest child of a Wesleyan clergyman. Educated at Kingswood School, Bath, he attended Worcester College, Oxford and graduated BA in 1880 and MA in 1893. He began theological studies in Birmingham but on his marriage in 1882 migrated to Sydney to improve his wife's health.

Ministry and school career

On arrival in Australia, Prescott was appointed to Parramatta Wesleyan Circuit and as a part-time tutor at the provisional theological institute. In 1886, he was ordained as a minister and became the founding president and headmaster of the Wesleyan Ladies' College, Burwood. (now MLC School). He introduced challenging academic studies for girls, as well as music and competitive games. In time ex-pupils excelled at the University of Sydney, enhancing the college's reputation. He also established a co-educational kindergarten, probably the first in the Australia. MLC School was given colours, crest, motto, uniform, magazine and other traditions from English public schools. He was greatly helped by his wife, Annie, who took charge of the domestic arrangements and music. In 1900 he moved to Newington College, Stanmore, as president and headmaster, the first to hold dual office. He fostered the ideal of a balanced liberal education within a Christian environment, with an emphasis on mathematics and classical studies. Other emphases were correct English, team games, and commitment to 'family, school, King and God'. He retired from Newington in 1931 after a record term. Prescott House, one of the eight Houses within the College, was named after Prescott as was Prescott Hall. Prescott Hall was previously used as the venue where the College hosted important school events such as end  of Season dinners and award nights, as well as debating, however, during 2020 the space was repurposed as the Year 12 Study Centre.

Community service
Prescott was elected president of the New South Wales Methodist Conference in 1910 and served as acting senior army chaplain during World War I, making many visits to camps and barracks. He was senior Methodist chaplain from 1919. In that year he was awarded an honorary doctorate of divinity by Emory University, Georgia, USA. Esteemed by his peers, Prescott became the spokesman for other headmasters in negotiations with governments, the university and Department of Education. He was a founder and several times chairman of the Teachers' Association of New South Wales and the foundation chairman, in 1923, of the Headmasters' Association. In retirement he continued on boards and committees and contributed to the Sydney Morning Herald. His portrait in oils hangs in Prescott Hall at Newington College.

Marriage and family
 

Prescott married Annie Elizabeth Price (d.1931) on 30 August 1882 at Cardiff, before migrating to Australia. They had five children: William Arnold Prescott (1883–1946); Annie Constance Prescott (d. in infancy 1885); Theodora Mary Prescott (1886–1966); Kathleen Margaret (Kitty) Prescott OBE (1888–1984); and Clarence Gordon Prescott MC (1892–1974). Theodora, Kitty and Clarence were all born at MLC School during Rev. Prescott's time as Principal. Annie Prescott died in 1931 and on his death Prescott was survived by two sons and two daughters.

Publications
 Pastoral Letters (Syd, 1911)
 Romance of School (Syd, 1932)

References

1857 births
1946 deaths
Staff of Newington College
Australian Methodist ministers
Australian headmasters
People educated at Kingswood School, Bath
Australian military chaplains
World War I chaplains
People from Bridport
Members of the United States National Academy of Sciences
Australian Army chaplains